

209001–209100 

|-id=054
| 209054 Lombkató ||  || Kató Lomb (1909–2003), a Hungarian interpreter, translator and one of the first simultaneous interpreters in the world || 
|-id=083
| 209083 Rioja ||  || Rioja is a wine made from grapes grown in the autonomous community of La Rioja and in parts of Navarre and the Basque province of Álava. || 
|}

209101–209200 

|-id=107
| 209107 Šafránek ||  || Jaroslav Šafránek (1890–1957), a Czech experimental physicist || 
|-id=148
| 209148 Dustindeford ||  || Dustin DeFord (1989–2013), one of the 19 Granite Mountain Hotshots who lost their lives fighting the 2013 Yarnell Hill Fire in Arizona || 
|-id=149
| 209149 Chrismackenzie ||  || Christopher MacKenzie (1983–2013), one of the 19 Granite Mountain Hotshots who lost their lives fighting the 2013 Yarnell Hill Fire in Arizona || 
|}

209201–209300 

|-id=209
| 209209 Ericmarsh ||  || Eric Marsh (1970–2013), one of the 19 Granite Mountain Hotshots who lost their lives fighting the 2013 Yarnell Hill Fire in Arizona || 
|}

209301–209400 

|-bgcolor=#f2f2f2
| colspan=4 align=center | 
|}

209401–209500 

|-bgcolor=#f2f2f2
| colspan=4 align=center | 
|}

209501–209600 

|-id=540
| 209540 Siurana ||  || The village of Siurana, at the top of an escarpment in the Prades Mountains in the Montsant region of Catalonia || 
|-id=552
| 209552 Isaacroberts ||  || Isaac Roberts (1829–1904), amateur astronomer and pioneer in astrophotography || 
|}

209601–209700 

|-bgcolor=#f2f2f2
| colspan=4 align=center | 
|}

209701–209800 

|-id=791
| 209791 Tokaj ||  || Tokaj, a historic town in northern Hungary || 
|}

209801–209900 

|-bgcolor=#f2f2f2
| colspan=4 align=center | 
|}

209901–210000 

|-bgcolor=#f2f2f2
| colspan=4 align=center | 
|}

References 

209001-210000